Lullaby is a 2010 Polish comedy film directed by Juliusz Machulski.

Cast 
 Robert Więckiewicz as Michal Makarewicz
 Małgorzata Buczkowska as Bozena Makarewicz
  as Dziadek Makarewicz
 Filip Ochinski as Wojtek Makarewicz
 Weronika Kosobudzka as Marysia Makarewicz
 Julia Janiszewska as Ola Makarewicz
 Jakub Bargiel as Kuba Makarewicz
 Patryk Bargiel as Kuba Makarewicz
 Krzysztof Kiersznowski as Roman Lapszow
 Jacek Koman as Listonosz
 Ewa Ziętek as Kobieta z opieki spolecznej
 Michał Zieliński as Ksiadz Marek
  as Ministrant
 Aleksandra Kisio as Tlumaczka

References

External links 

2010 comedy films
2010 films
Films directed by Juliusz Machulski
Films scored by Michał Lorenc
Polish black comedy films